Manuel Antonio Ay (1817-1847) was a Yucatec Maya military leader and revolutionary, and chief of the village of Chichimila. In 1847, he met with Cecilio Chi, Jacinto Pat, and Bonifacio Novelo to plan the uprising that would become the Caste War. Reportedly, he stated that his goal was to have the white men driven from the Peninsula. He was discovered when a bartender found a suspicious letter he had left in his hat, and was arrested and soon afterwards executed on July 26th of the same year, under order of Miguel Barbachano, President of the Republic of Yucatán. His corpse was transferred to Chichimilá, where it was buried, just after being exhibited to warn the rebels.

References 
 Reed, Nelson. (1964) The Caste War of Yucatan Stanford University Press, Palo Alto.

Maya people
Yucatán
1817 births
1847 deaths